Bathybembix drakei is a species of deep-water sea snail, a marine gastropod mollusk in the family Eucyclidae.

Description
The shell grows to a height of 23.5 mm.

Distribution
This marine species occurs off the Drake Passage, Antarctica at a depth of 3400 m.

References

drakei
Gastropods described in 1990